Marchioness Petronilla Paolini Massimi (1663–1726), also known by the Arcadian pseudonym Fidalma Partenide, was an Italian poetess and writer. Her difficult life is recorded in her autobiographical poems. She was an admired member of the Arcadian Academy, whose work is noted today for its strong defense of women and anticipation of gender theory.

Life

Early life 
Petronilla Paolini was born in Tagliacozzo, Abruzzo, on 24 December 1663, the daughter of Baron Francesco Paolini of Marsica and Silvia Argoli. Her father, Baron of Ortona dei Marsi and Gentleman of the Colonna, was considered to be a highly cultured and successful politician, her mother "thoughtful, introvert and lover of solitude."

When Petronilla was four years old, her father was murdered in an ambush; mother and daughter then fled to Rome, taking refuge at the court of Pope Clement X. Petronilla received a good education during the time she spent at the boarding school of the Convent of the Holy Spirit.

Marriage 
Clement X had Petronilla removed from the convent shortly before her tenth birthday and married to his nephew, Marquis Francesco Massimi.  Massimi, at that time aged 40, was a soldier with noble rank but a reputedly callous nature, then keeper of the Castel Sant'Angelo, Rome's notorious prison.

Petronilla would later write about these events, as in her poem, "Unbind Your Angered Tresses," in which she bluntly mourned: "the strong hand of fate/Joined the fair April of my years/to alien old age."

Return to the Convent 

After the death of one of her sons, Petronilla re-entered the Convent of the Holy Spirit, where she wrote the works for which she is known.

These include both the unpublished poems and writings that might be expected of a woman of this period, but also published works, including musical libretti. As early as 1696, she was collaborating with Carlo Agostino Badia, providing the texts for several of his oratorios, including the Legend of the Cross (Italian: L'Invenzione Della Croce).

Legacy 
She died in Rome on 3 March 1726, and was buried in the Church of St. Egidio.

In 2022, her memoir, Life of the Marchesa Petronilla Paolini Massimi described by herself (Italian, Vita della Marchesa Petronilla Paolini Massimi da sé medesima descritta li 12 agosto 1703) was published for the first time in its complete form.

Works 
Her writings include:

 Non disdire alla Donna gli esercizi letterari e cavallereschi (no date), 
 Oratorio per la morte del Redentore (1697), 
 La corona poetica rinterzata in lode di Clemente XI (1701), 
 Canzoni epitalamiche (1704), 
 Le Muse in gala (1704), 
 I giuochi olimpici (1705), 
 "Note sul Simposio di Platone", in Prose delgi Arcadi (Tome III).

References

Notes

Citations

Bibliography 
 Barca, Lisa A. (2008). "Paolini Massimi, Petronilla (1663-1726)". Italian Women Writers. The University of Chicago Library. Retrieved 20 April 2022.
 Brancaleoni, Francesca (2014). "Paolini, Petronilla". In Dizionario biografico degli italiani. Vol. 81. Istituto dell'Enciclopedia Italiana. Treccani. Retrieved 20 April 2022.
 Caruso, Carlo (2005). "Paolini Massimi, Petronilla". In Hainsworth, Peter and Robey, David (eds.). The Oxford Companion to Italian Literature. Oxford University Press.
 Commire, Anne, ed. (2007). "Massimi, Petronilla Paolini". In Dictionary of Women Worldwide: 25,000 Women through the Ages. Vol. 2: M–Z. Farmington Hills, MI: Thomson Gale. p. 1,261.
 Mostaccio, Sara (5 November 2019). "Poetesse italiane dimenticate. La vita (difficile) di Petronilla Paolini Massimi, femminista ante litteram". Elle. Retrieved 20 April 2022.
 Tangredi, Americo (2020). ""Il mio nome è Fidalma Partenide". Storia di Petronilla Paolini Massimi, poetessa marsicana". Espressione24. Retrieved 20 April 2022.
 "Paolini Màssimi, Petronilla". Enciclopedia De Agostini. Sapere. (n.d.). Retrieved 20 April 2022.

External links 
 Verdone, Emanuela (23 February 2015). "Silent whispers. The life of Petronilla Paolini Massimi". Abruzzolink Social Magazine. Retrieved 20 April 2022.
 "Massimi, Petronilla Paolini (1663–1726)". Encyclopedia.com. (n.d.). Retrieved 20 April 2022.

1663 births
1726 deaths
18th-century Italian women writers
18th-century Italian poets